Ryan Hodson (born 10 October 1989) is an Australian rugby union player currently playing for English Championship side London Welsh. His playing position is loose forward.

Hodson has had a nomadic experience as a professional rugby player. He made a couple of appearances for the Melbourne Rebels while providing short-term injury cover in the final weeks of the 2012 Super Rugby season. Not offered a permanent contract for the franchise in 2013, Hodson headed to Europe where he played Championship rugby for Jersey. On 25 April 2015, Hodson signed for Championship rivals London Welsh from the 2015–16 season.

References

1989 births
Living people
Australian rugby union players
Rugby union flankers
Western Force players
Melbourne Rebels players
Jersey Reds players
Australian expatriate rugby union players
Expatriate rugby union players in Jersey
Australian expatriate sportspeople in England
Sportsmen from Western Australia
London Welsh RFC players
Expatriate rugby union players in England
Australian expatriate sportspeople in Jersey
Rugby union players from Western Australia